This is a list of cities, towns and villages in the county of Cambridgeshire, England.  It includes places in the former county of Huntingdonshire, now a district of Cambridgeshire.

A
Abbotsley
Abbots Ripton
Abington Pigotts
Alconbury
Alconbury Weston
Aldreth
Alwalton
America
Arrington
Ashley

B
Babraham
Balsham
Barham
Bar Hill
Barnwell
Barrington
Bartlow
Barton
Barway
Bassingbourn
Benwick
Blackhorse Drove
Bluntisham
Bottisham
Bourn
Boxworth
Brampton
Brington
Broughton
Brinkley
Buckden
Buckworth
Burrough Green
Burwell
Bury
Bythorn

C
Caldecote (Huntingdonshire)
Caldecote (South Cambridgeshire)
Cambourne
Cambridge
Camps End
Cardinal's Green
Carlton
Castle Camps
Catworth
Caxton
Chatteris
Cherry Hinton
Chesterton, Cambridge
Chesterton, Huntingdonshire
Chettisham
Cheveley
Childerley
Chippenham
Chittering
Christchurch
Coates
Coldham
Collett's Bridge
Colne
Conington
Coppingford
Comberton
Commercial End
Coton
Cottenham
Coveney
Covington
Croxton
Croydon

D
Denton
Deeping Gate
Diddington
Ditton Green
Doddington
Dogsthorpe
Downham
Dry Drayton
Dullingham
Duxford

E
Earith
East Hatley
Easton
Eastrea
Eaton Ford
Eaton Socon
Ellington
Elm
Elsworth
Eltisley
Elton
Ely
Euximoor
Eye
Eye Green
Eynesbury
Eynesbury Hardwicke

F
Farcet
Fen Ditton
Fen Drayton
Fenstanton
Fenton
Fitton End
Folksworth
Fordham
Foul Anchor
Four Gotes
Fowlmere
Foxton
Friday Bridge
Fulbourn

G
Gamlingay
Girton
Glatton
Godmanchester
Gorefield
Grafham
Grantchester
Graveley
Great Abington
Great Chishill
Great Eversden
Great Gransden
Great Gidding
Great Paxton
Great Shelford
Great Staughton
Great Wilbraham
Guilden Morden
Guyhirn

H
Haddenham
Haddon
Hail Weston
Hamerton
Hardwick
Harlton
Harston
Haslingfield
Hatley
Hatley St George
Hauxton
Hemingford Abbots
Hemingford Grey
Heydon
Highfields
Hildersham
Hilton
Hinxton
Histon
Holme
Holywell
Horningsea
Horseheath
Houghton
Huntingdon

I
Ickleton
Impington
Isleham

J
Jesus Lane

K
Kennett
Keyston
Kimbolton
Kings Ripton
Kingston
Kirtling
Knapwell
Kneesworth

L
Landbeach
Leighton Bromswold
Leverington
Linton
Litlington
Little Abington
Little Chishill
Little Ditton
Little Downham
Little Eversden
Little Gidding
Little Gransden
Little Ouse
Little Paxton
Littleport
Little Shelford
Little Thetford
Little Wilbraham
Lode
Lolworth
Long Meadow
Longstanton
Longstowe

M
Madingley
Manea
March
Melbourn
Meldreth
Mepal
Midloe
Milton
MolesworthMorborne
Murrow

N
Needingworth
Newton-in-the-Isle
Newton, South Cambridgeshire
Northstowe

O
Oakington
Offord Cluny
Offord D'Arcy
Oldhurst
Old Weston
Orwell
Over

P
Pampisford
Papworth Everard
Papworth St Agnes
Parson Drove
Perry
Peterborough
Pidley
Pondersbridge
Prickwillow
Pymoor

Q
Queen Adelaide

R
Rampton
Ramsey
Ramsey Forty Foot
Ramsey Heights
Ramsey Mereside
Ramsey St Mary's
Reach
Ring's End

S
Sawston
Sawtry
Saxon Street
Shepreth
Shingay
Shudy Camps
Sibson
Snailwell
Soham
Somersham
Southoe
Spaldwick
Stapleford
Steeple Gidding
Steeple Morden
Stetchworth
Stibbington
Stilton
St Ives
St Neots
Stonea
Stonely
Stow-cum-Quy
Stow Longa
Streetley End
Stretham
Stuntney
Sutton
Sutton Gault
Sutton-in-the-Isle
Swaffham Bulbeck
Swaffham Prior
Swavesey
Swingbrow

T
Tadlow
Tetworth
Teversham
The Raveleys
The Stukeleys
Tholomas Drove
Thorney
Thorney Toll
Thriplow
Tilbrook
Tips End
Toft
Toseland
Trumpington
Turves
Tydd St Giles

U
Upend
Upton (Huntingdonshire)
Upton (Peterborough)
Upware
Upwood

W

Warboys
Wardy Hill
Waresley
Washingley
Waterbeach
Water Newton
Welches Dam
Wendy
Wentworth
Westley Waterless
Weston Colville
 Weston Green
Westry
Westwick
West Wickham
West Wratting
Whaddon
Whittlesey
Whittlesford
Whittlesford Bridge
Wicken
Wilburton
Willingham
Wimblington
Wimpole
Winwick
Wisbech
Wisbech St Mary
Wistow
Witcham
Witchford
Wood Ditton
Woodditton
Woodhurst
Woodwalton
Woolley
Wothorpe
Wyton

Y
Yaxley
Yelling

See also
List of Cambridgeshire settlements by population
List of civil parishes in Cambridgeshire
List of places in England

 
Cambridgeshire
Places